Pat Bianchi is an American jazz organist from New York, known for playing the Hammond B-3 organ.

Career
Originally from Rochester, New York, Bianchi started playing after being given an organ at the age of 7. His father and grandfathers had been professional musicians before him. At high school he also started playing piano, and went on to enroll in Eastman School of Music's preparatory program for piano and music theory.

Bianchi graduated from the Berklee College of Music, where he met and worked with Joey DeFrancesco, in the late 1990s. He relocated to Denver, where he played organ and piano at local clubs, including the house band of the El Chapultepec club, Chapultergeist, before moving to New York City in 2008.

He joined Lou Donaldson's quartet, and has worked extensively with guitarist Pat Martino, who has been described as Bianchi's mentor.

After playing with several more established musicians, he moved into the role of band leader, releasing several albums since 2002.

Bianchi has been nominated for a Grammy Award on two occasions.

He is also an associate professor at Berklee.

Discography

As leader
The Art of The Jazz Organ Trio (Synergy Music, 2002)
 3osity (Capri, 2006)
East Coast Roots (Jazzed Media, 2006)
 Back Home (Doodlin', 2010)
 A Higher Standard (21H, 2015)
 In the Moment (Savant, 2018)
 Something To Say: The Music of Steve Wonder (Savant, 2021)

As sideman
 Ed Cherry – It's All Good (Posi-Tone, 2012)
 Joey DeFrancesco – Never Can Say Goodbye (HighNote, 2010)
 Chuck Loeb – Plain 'n' Simple (Tweety, 2011)
 Pat Martino – Formidable (HighNote, 2017)
 Ralph Peterson – The Unity Project: Outer Reaches (Onyx, 2010)
 JC Stylles – Exhilaration and Other States (Motéma, 2011)
 Tim Warfield – A Sentimental Journey (Criss Cross, 2010)

References

External links

Living people
1975 births
Berklee College of Music alumni
Eastman School of Music alumni
21st-century American keyboardists
21st-century American male musicians
21st-century organists
American jazz organists
American male jazz musicians
American male organists